Eclipse is the seventh studio album by Finnish heavy metal band Amorphis. The lyrics are from a play based on the Kullervo legend (told in the Kalevala), written by Finnish poet and playwright Paavo Haavikko in 1982.

Eclipse is also notable for being current vocalist Tomi Joutsen's debut with Amorphis following the departure of longtime singer Pasi Koskinen in 2005. It also marked the reintroduction of death growls into their music, albeit in limited quantity.

In February 2008, the record was certified gold in Finland, having sold over 15,000 units.

Track listing

Credits

Amorphis 
 Tomi Joutsen − vocals
 Esa Holopainen − lead guitar
 Tomi Koivusaari − rhythm guitar
 Niclas Etelävuori − bass
 Santeri Kallio − keyboards, piano, synthesizer and other samples
 Jan Rechberger − drums

Other personnel 
 Marko Hietala − vocals producer, backing vocals
 Mikko Karmila – mixing
 Travis Smith – album artwork

References 

Amorphis albums
Nuclear Blast albums
2006 albums
Music based on the Kalevala